Unlocked is a 2023 South Korean thriller film directed by Kim Tae-joon in his directorial debut, starring Chun Woo-hee, Im Si-wan and Kim Hee-won. It was released on Netflix for streaming on February 17, 2023.

Synopsis 
Lee Na-Mi (Chun Woo-Hee) works as a marketer at a start-up company. She is an ordinary office worker who works hard everyday. She also works part time at her father’s cafe, Cafe Mizi. 

One day, Lee Na-Mi loses her smartphone on the bus and it is picked up by someone. When Na-mi uses a friend’s phone to call, Oh Jun-Yeong (Im Si-Wan) uses a fake voice app to speak so his voice won’t be recognized, instructing her to pick up her phone at a repair shop. He does this so he can get access to her password and under the pretence of fixing her broken phone screen, he installs spyware on her phone.

Na-Mi unexpectedly walks around and does everything with her phone: every action, conversation and text being monitored by Jun-Yeong. Jun-Yeong slowly infiltrates into Na-Mi’s personal life, causing her father to be suspicious of him. Na-Mi expresses curiosity about Jun-Yeong as they seem to have a lot in common. He claims to work at a software company and seemingly tries to help her with the spyware.

Na-Mi is fired from her job after Jun-Yeong leaks confidential information and frames her. He also tries to make Na-Mi believe that it was her best friend who is behind the spyware. Ultimately Jun-Yeong succeeds in isolating Na-Mi from everyone important in her life. 

Meanwhile, Detective Woo Ji-Man (Kim Hee-Won) investigates a murder case involving a dead body that was found on a remote mountain. There, he finds clues that points to his son Woo Jun-Yeong as the possible perpetrator. Seven additional bodies are found which points to Jun-Yeong who keeps the smartphones of his victims, the latest one, Eun Mi-gyeong, who authority believed had run away.

In a shocking twist at the end, Na-Mi and her father fight for their lives while Detective Woo Ji-Man uncovers the truth about Jun-Yeong.

Cast 
 Chun Woo-hee as Lee Na-mi
 A marketer at a startup company.
 Im Si-wan as Oh Jun-yeong
 A man who approaches Nami after accidentally picking up her smartphone.
 Kim Hee-won as Woo Ji-man
 A detective chasing the culprit of a murder case.
Park Ho-san as Lee Seung-woo
 Nami's father.
Kim Ye-won as Jeong Eun-joo
 Nami's best friend.
Oh Hyun-kyung as CEO Oh
 The president of startup company who is Nami's senior.
 Jeon Jin-oh as Kim Jung-ho
 Kim Joo-ryoung as Eun-mi
 Gil Hae-yeon as Je-yeon

Production 
The film is based on the Japanese novel of the same name by Akira Teshigawara, which was adapted in to 2018 film Stolen Identity. The principal photography began in March 2021 and ended on June 27, 2021.

The film was originally scheduled for the theatrical release by CJ ENM, but later decided to be released on Netflix.

References

External links 
 
 
 
 
 
 
 

2020s South Korean films
2020s Korean-language films
Korean-language Netflix original films
2023 directorial debut films
2023 thriller films
South Korean thriller films
Films based on Japanese novels
Films about mobile phones